Tim Bratton is one of the founders of Rhapsody.

He was a member of the MPEG (Motion Picture Experts Group) and was involved in creation of the audio specifications for the MPEG standard, commonly known as MP3. He is a named inventor on 6 US Patents that were developed in the creation of the Rhapsody music streaming service. 8,738,789
8,131,865
7,792,787
7,099,848
7,020,637 
6,611,813

References 

Living people
Year of birth missing (living people)